Heinz Knüwe (born 16 January 1956) is a German retired professional footballer who played as a defender.

Career statistics

References

External links
 

1956 births
Living people
German footballers
Association football defenders
Bundesliga players
2. Bundesliga players
TSV 1860 Munich players
SV Lippstadt 08 players
SC Herford players
VfL Bochum players
Hannover 96 players
SC Verl players